Azamora is a genus of snout moths. It was described by Francis Walker in 1858, and is known from Venezuela, Brazil, Suriname, and French Guiana.

Species
 Azamora bilinealis (Amsel, 1956)
 Azamora corusca (Lederer, 1863)
 Azamora crameriana (Stoll in Cramer & Stoll, 1781)
 Azamora pelopsana (Walker, 1863)
 Azamora penicillana (Walker, 1863)
 Azamora splendens (Druce, 1895)
 Azamora tortriciformis Walker, 1858

References

Chrysauginae
Pyralidae genera